Robert Younis (born 14 August 1985) is a Lebanese-Australian footballer who played for Bonnyrigg White Eagles FC and APIA Leichhardt in the New South Wales Premier League. With great success at the club, in 2017 he decided to hang up his boots.

Club career
Younis signed for Adelaide in 2008 after an impressive two seasons for APIA Leichhardt in the NSW Premier League which saw him net a phenomenal 38 goals in just 43 appearances. After an indifferent start to his professional career at United, Robert came on as a 78th minute sub against Perth Glory and made an immediate impact setting up Brazilian Alemão to equalise in the eventual 2–1 win.

In April 2009, a goal shy Robbie was released from Adelaide United by mutual consent. He has since re-signed with former club, APIA Leichhardt for the 2009 NSW Premier League season.

As of 26 April 2009, Robbie has played 7 games for APIA and has yet to score a goal.

On 2 May 2009, Younis finally got on the scoresheet with a well taken penalty against bitter rivals Marconi Stallions.

Robbie continues to lead the line for APIA and had an exceptional 2010 season where he banged home 16 goals.

Younis has signed for the Bonnyrigg White Eagles for the 2012 NSWPL season. 

During Robbie’s time at the eagles, he played a major role within the succession of the club. In 2012 Bonnyrigg White Eagles were crowned premiers having 15 more points then second place Sydney Olympic. They did fall short losing 3-1 to Marconi Stallions. The next time they appeared in the final stage in 2014 losing the semi final. 2015 was the year Younis won it for the Eagles, scaring a magnificent free kick outside a few yards from the box. The fans loved him, he wasn’t quick but he has an amazing touch that did not disappoint the support from the Avala Boys.

Career statistics
(Correct as of 22 December 2008)

1 – included A-League final series statistics
2 – includes Club World Cup statistics; Asian Champions League statistics included in season commencing after group stages.

References

External links
 Oz Football profile

1985 births
Living people
A-League Men players
Australian soccer players
Adelaide United FC players
Bonnyrigg White Eagles FC players
National Premier Leagues players
Association football forwards